Petra Setzkorn is an East German sprint canoer who competed in the early 1970s. She won six medals at the ICF Canoe Sprint World Championships with two silvers (K-2 500 m: 1971, K-4 500 m: 1970) and four bronzes (K-1 500 m: 1970, 1971; K-2 500 m: 1970, K-4 500 m: 1971).

References

East German female canoeists
Living people
Year of birth missing (living people)
ICF Canoe Sprint World Championships medalists in kayak